Prime Directive is a role-playing game set in the Star Trek-derived Star Fleet Universe. The game has gone through two different incarnations.

Prime Directive RPG
The original release of Prime Directive was published by Task Force Games in 1993.  Using an in-house design by Mark Costello and Timothy D. Olsen, it used a D6-style system similar to Shadowrun and Star Wars. Aspects of the game include a multi-tiered task resolution system, where characters can achieve 'Complete', 'Moderate', 'Minimal', 'Failure' or 'Botch' levels of success with their actions, and the Character Reputation and Background system that allows characters to “spontaneously” develop skills, abilities, and prior associations appropriate to the mission at hand. 

The published books for the game included the core rulebook, a Federation sourcebook. and a few adventure books.

GURPS Prime Directive

After the folding of Task Force Games and the cancellation of the original Prime Directive line, Amarillo Design Bureau, Inc., the new publishers of Star Fleet Universe games, were left with the question of what to do with PD. They were primarily a wargame company, and the poor sales of the supplements were cause for a reexamination.  Eventually, they approached Steve Jackson Games to utilize the Powered by GURPS format.

D20 Prime Directive and D20M Prime Directive

The core rulebook, D20 Klingons, D20 Romulans (no D20M as of Aug 2011), and D20 Federation are available for this system. Supplements for the Gorns, Tholians and other empires/races are in various writing stages.

Prime Teams

Prime Teams are a concept pioneered in the original Prime Directive game.  The concept is a specialized landing party that can perform a variety of functions, including science, negotiations, and combat. While "Prime Teams" are a Federation designation, nearly every empire has their own equivalent.

Reception
Chris McCubbin reviewed Prime Directive for Pyramid #7 (May 1994) and stated that "My advice to Star Trek fans interested in Prime Directive is to play it, but play it on its own terms, as a good, solid outer space military adventure, without trying to squeeze it into the TV show's mold in every tiny detail. To tell you the truth, the universe of Prime Directive is much more playable than the Star Trek universe anyway, while preserving most of the elements that got trekkies interested in Star Trek in the first place."

Reviews
White Wolf #48 (Oct., 1994)
Valkyrie #1 (Sept., 1994)

References

Role-playing games based on Star Trek
Role-playing games introduced in 1993
Star Fleet Universe
Task Force Games games
Space opera role-playing games